Christian Heljanko (born 2 April 1997) is a Finnish professional ice hockey goaltender for Tappara of the Finnish Liiga. Heljanko made his Liiga debut appearance for Tappara during the 2017–18 Liiga season. In December 2021, he made his debut in the Finland men's national ice hockey team.

References

External links
 

1997 births
Living people
Finnish ice hockey goaltenders
Lempäälän Kisa players
People from Porvoo
Sportspeople from Uusimaa
Tappara players